Charles Duke Yonge (30 November 1812 – 30 November 1891) was an English historian, classicist and cricketer. He wrote numerous works of modern history, and translated several classical works. His younger brother was George Edward Yonge.

Biography
Charles Duke Yonge was born in Eton, Berkshire on 30 November 1812. He was baptised on 25 December 1812. He was the eldest of eight children to the Reverend Charles Yonge (1781–1830) and Elizabeth Lord (?–1868). His parents married on 4 December 1811. His grandparents were Duke Yonge and Catherine Crawley on his father's side, and Joseph Lord and Corbetta Owen of Pembroke South Wales on his mother's side.

He was educated at Eton College. At age eighteen, he became a foundation scholar at King's College, Cambridge between 1831 and 1833.

On 17 May 1834, he attended St. Mary's Hall, Oxford, a dependency of and later incorporated into Oriel College. He graduated with a first-class honours B.A. in Classics in December 1834. In 1874, he acquired his M.A. from Keble College.

As a cricket player, during the 1836 season for Oxford University, he scored a total of 85 runs in three matches and caught one player out.

Works
 The Life of Arthur, Duke of Wellington (1860)
 The History of the British Navy: From the Earliest Period to the Present Time (1863)
 The History of England, from the Earliest Times to the Death of Viscount Palmerston, 1865
 The History of France Under the Bourbons, a.D. 1589–1830, (1866, 4 vols.)
 Life and Administration of Robert Banks, Second Earl of Liverpool (3 vols., 1868)
 The Life of Marie Antoinette, Queen of France (1876)
 The Constitutional History of England from 1760 and 1860 (1882)
 Life of Sir Walter Scott
 England's Great Generals: Sketches of the Lives of Duke of Marlborough, Lord Clive, Duke of Wellington, Sir Charles Napier, Lord Gough
 Flowers of History, Especially Such As Relate to the Affairs of Britain
 Seven Heroines of Christendom
 Three Centuries of Modern History

Translations
 Cicero, De Inventione (1853)
 Cicero, On the Laws
 Cicero, On the Republic
 Cicero, The Nature of the Gods and on Divination (1853)
 Cicero, The Orations of Marcus Tullius Cicero (1888)
 Cicero, Tusculan Disputations: On the Nature of the Gods, And on the Commonwealth
 Diogenes Laërtius, The Lives and Opinions of Eminent Philosophers (1853)
 Philo of Alexandria, The Works of Philo: Complete and Unabridged (1854–55)

Dictionaries
 A phraseological English-Latin dictionary, for the use of Eton [and other schools] and King's College, London (1856)
 An English-Greek lexicon

Editor
 Letters of Horace Walpole, 2 vols.
 Essays Of John Dryden
 Three Centuries of English Literature
 A gradus ad Parnassum: For the use of Eton, Westminster, Harrow, and Charterhouse schools, King's college, London, and Marlborough college (1850) Longmans

References

Bibliography
The Ideas That Have Influenced Civilization in the Original Documents: Ten Volumes. Vol. III: The Roman World  (Milwaukee: The Roberts-Manchester Publishing Co., 1901). Oliver J. Thatcher, PhD, Editor.

External links

 
 
 
 The Online Books Page

English classical scholars
English cricketers
Oxford University cricketers
1812 births
1891 deaths
People educated at Eton College
Alumni of King's College, Cambridge
Naval historians
English cricketers of 1826 to 1863
19th-century English historians
Alumni of St Mary Hall, Oxford